Wildlike is a 2014 American feature film written and directed by Frank Hall Green.  Filmed in Alaska and starring Ella Purnell, Bruce Greenwood, Brian Geraghty, Nolan Gerard Funk and Ann Dowd, it has a 92% Fresh rating on Rotten Tomatoes, and has played over 150 film festivals and won over 100 festival awards.
It was filmed on location in Denali National Park, Juneau, Anchorage, Palmer, Whittier, Matanuska Glacier, and on the state ferry boat Kennicott run by the Alaska Marine Highway System.

It was produced by Green, with Julie Christeas, Schuyler Weiss and Joseph Stephans, and executive-produced by Christine Vachon. The director of photography was Hillary Spera, and it was edited by Mako Kamitsuna.  The score was composed by Daniel Bensi and Saunder Jurriaans, and the production designer was Chad Keith.

Plot
Mackenzie (Ella Purnell), a 14-year-old girl, is sent to stay with her uncle (Brian Geraghty) in Juneau, Alaska, after the death of her father and the hospitalization of her mother.  After being molested by her uncle, she runs away and ends up finding healing in a journey across the state of Alaska, following an older widowed backpacker (Bruce Greenwood), who eventually helps her return to her home in Seattle.

Cast 
 Ella Purnell as Mackenzie
 Bruce Greenwood as Rene Bartlett
 Brian Geraghty as Uncle
 Ann Dowd as Jeanie
 Nolan Gerard Funk as Tommy

Release
A joint project by Greenmachine Film, Tandem Pictures and Killer Films Wildlike was released nationwide in 2015 to positive reviews. It opened the 2014 Anchorage International Film Festival, and was screened at the Napa Valley Film Festival, Athens International Film Festival. and the Oceanside International Film Festival.

After screening at the 2015 Hamptons International Film Festival, it was shown at over 200 others, including the Woodstock, Napa Valley, Newport Beach, IndieMemphis, Woods Hole, Cleveland, Cork, Austin, Atlanta, Independent Boston, Savannah, Cucalorus, and St. Louis, and Minneapolis-St. Paul International film festivals. It was also shown at Hawaii's Big Island Film Festival, where it received the Best Feature prize.

On Rotten Tomatoes, Wildlike holds an approval rating of 92% based on 13 reviews, and an average rating of 7.4/10.

References

External links
 
 Wildlike Official Website
Greenmachine Film website

2014 films
2010s teen drama films
2010s adventure drama films
American teen drama films
American adventure drama films
Films set in Alaska
Films shot in Alaska
Killer Films films
2010s English-language films
2010s American films